Richard Witting (born: Witkowski; 19 October 1856, Berlin – 22 December 1923, Berlin) was a Prussian politician and financier. 

Witting studied law at Göttingen, where he became member of Burschenschaft Hannovera (fraternity), and later became mayor of Poznań in 1891–1902. From 1902 to 1910 he was director of Nationalbank für Deutschland (National Bank for Germany). Witting was a brother of Maximilian Harden and father-in-law of Hans Paasche. Witting is considered one of the major authors (fathers) of the democratic Weimar Constitution, which he and Hugo Preuß worked out in first drafts. He was also a convert to Lutheran Protestantism from Judaism, a common practice of this epoch.

References 
 Witold Jakóbczyk, Przetrwać na Wartą 1815-1914, Dzieje narodu i państwa polskiego, vol. III-55, Krajowa Agencja Wydawnicza, Warszawa 1989
 Joachim Bergmann: Die Schaubühne – Die Weltbühne 1905–1933, Bibliographie und Register mit Annotationen. Saur, München 1991, p. 261

References

 

1856 births
1923 deaths
Politicians from Berlin
19th-century German Jews
Converts to Lutheranism from Judaism
National Liberal Party (Germany) politicians
Prussian politicians
Members of the Prussian House of Lords
Mayors of Poznań
Businesspeople from Berlin
Französisches Gymnasium Berlin alumni